Christopher James Christie (born September 6, 1962) is an American politician, lawyer, political commentator, lobbyist, and former federal prosecutor who served as the 55th governor of New Jersey from 2010 to 2018.

Christie, who was born in Newark, New Jersey, was raised in Livingston, New Jersey. After graduating in 1984 from the University of Delaware, he earned a J.D. at Seton Hall University School of Law. A Republican, Christie was elected county freeholder (legislator) for Morris County, New Jersey, serving from 1995 to 1998. By 2002, he had campaigned for Presidents George H. W. Bush and George W. Bush; the latter appointed him U.S. Attorney for New Jersey, a position he held from 2002 to 2008.

Christie won the 2009 Republican primary for Governor of New Jersey and defeated Democratic incumbent Jon Corzine in the general election. In his first term, he was credited with cutting spending, capping property tax growth and engaging in recovery efforts after Hurricane Sandy. He was re-elected by a wide margin in 2013, defeating State Senate Majority Leader Barbara Buono. Christie's second term as governor was overshadowed by several controversies, namely the Fort Lee lane closure scandal and his various absences from the state. He ended his tenure among the least popular governors in the United States, and was succeeded by Democrat Phil Murphy.

Christie chaired the Republican Governors Association during the 2014 election cycle. On June 30, 2015, he announced his candidacy for the Republican nomination in the 2016 presidential election. He suspended his candidacy on February 10, 2016, following a poor showing in the New Hampshire primary. Later, he endorsed eventual winner Donald Trump and was named head of Trump's transition planning team. Christie left office in 2018 after his second term as Governor of New Jersey and registered as a lobbyist in June 2020.

Early life and education 
Christie was born in Newark, New Jersey, to Sondra A. (née Grasso), a telephone receptionist, and Wilbur James "Bill" Christie, a certified public accountant who graduated from Rutgers Business School. His mother was of Italian (Sicilian) ancestry, and his father is of German, Scottish, and Irish descent. Christie's family moved to Livingston, New Jersey, after the 1967 Newark riots, and Christie lived there until he graduated from Livingston High School in 1980. At Livingston, Christie served as class president, played catcher for the baseball team, and was selected as a New Jersey Representative to the United States Senate Youth Program.

Christie's father and mother were Republican and Democratic, respectively. He has credited his Democratic-leaning mother for indirectly making him a Republican by encouraging him to volunteer for the gubernatorial candidate who became his role model, Tom Kean. Christie had become interested in Kean after the politician, then a state legislator, spoke to Christie's junior high school class.

Christie graduated from the University of Delaware in 1984 with a Bachelor of Arts in political science; while there, he served as president of the student body. He graduated from Seton Hall University School of Law with a J.D. in 1987. He was admitted to the New Jersey State Bar Association and the Bar of the United States District Court, District of New Jersey, in December 1987. He was awarded honorary doctorate degrees by Rutgers University and Monmouth University in 2010.

Law practice and local politics

Lawyer 
In 1987, Christie joined the law firm of Dughi, Hewit & Palatucci of Cranford, New Jersey. In 1993, he was named a partner in the firm. Christie specialized in securities law, appellate practice, election law, and government affairs. He is a member of the American Bar Association and the New Jersey State Bar Association and was a member of the Election Law Committee of the New Jersey State Bar Association. From 1999 to 2001, Christie was registered statehouse lobbyist for Dughi and Hewit.

Morris County Freeholder 
Christie volunteered for President George H. W. Bush's 1992 re-election campaign in New Jersey and became close to Bush's state director, Bill Palatucci. Following the campaign, Christie decided to run for office and moved to Mendham Township. In 1993, Christie launched a primary challenge against the New Jersey Senate Majority Leader, John H. Dorsey. However, Christie's campaign ended after Dorsey successfully challenged the validity of Christie's petition to appear on the ballot.

In 1994, Christie was elected as a Republican to the Board of County Commissioners, or legislators, for Morris County, New Jersey, after he and a running mate defeated incumbents in the party primary. Following the election, the defeated incumbents filed a defamation lawsuit against Christie based on statements made during the primary campaign. Christie had incorrectly stated that the incumbents were under "investigation" for violating certain local laws. The lawsuit was settled out of court, with Christie acknowledging that the prosecutor had convened an "inquiry" instead of an "investigation", and apologizing for the error, which he said was unintentional.

As a commissioner, Christie required the county government to obtain three quotes from qualified firms for all contracts. He led a successful effort to bar county officials from accepting gifts from people and firms doing business with the county. He voted to raise the county's open space tax for land preservation; however, county taxes, on the whole, were decreased by 6.6% during his tenure. He successfully pushed for the dismissal of an architect hired to design a new jail, saying that the architect was costing taxpayers too much money. The architect then sued Christie for defamation over remarks he made about the dismissal, eventually dropping the suit without explanation.

In 1995, Christie announced a bid for a seat in the New Jersey General Assembly; he and attorney Rick Merkt ran as a ticket against incumbent Assemblyman Anthony Bucco and attorney Michael Patrick Carroll in the Republican primary. Christie ran as a pro-choice candidate and supporter of the ban on assault weapons. Bucco and Carroll, the establishment candidates, defeated the up-and-comers by a wide margin. After this loss, Christie's bid for re-nomination to the freeholder board was unlikely, as unhappy Republicans recruited John J. Murphy to run against Christie in 1997. Murphy defeated Christie in the primary. Murphy, who had falsely accused Christie of having the county pay his legal bills in the architect's lawsuit, was sued by Christie after the election. They settled out of court with the Freeholders admitting wrongdoing and apologizing. Christie's career in Morris County politics was over by 1998.

Lobbyist 
When Christie's part-time position as a Chosen Freeholder lapsed, he returned full attention to his law firm Dughi, Hewit & Palatucci. Alongside fellow partner and later, gubernatorial campaign fundraiser Bill Palatucci, Christie's firm opened an office in the state capital, Trenton, devoted mainly to lobbying. Between 1999 and 2001, Christie and Palatucci lobbied on behalf of, among others, GPU Energy for deregulation of New Jersey's electric and gas industry; the Securities Industry Association to block the inclusion of securities fraud under the state's Consumer Fraud Act; Hackensack University Medical Center for state grants; and the University of Phoenix for a New Jersey higher education license. During the 2000 presidential election, Christie was George W. Bush's campaign lawyer for the state of New Jersey.

United States Attorney

Appointment 
On December 7, 2001, President George W. Bush appointed Christie the U.S. Attorney for the District of New Jersey. During a Republican presidential debate in August 2015, Christie falsely claimed he had been appointed by President Bush on September 10, 2001, and that the 9/11 attacks occurred in his state the next day. Some members of the New Jersey Bar professed disappointment at Christie's lack of experience. At the time, he had never practiced in a federal courtroom before, and had little experience in criminal law. Christie received the overwhelming support of the Republican Party in New Jersey. A spokesperson for Acting Governor Donald DiFrancesco, who selected nominees for the position, said that he received hundreds of letters of support for Christie "from everyone from the Assembly speaker down to the county level, close to every member of the Legislature and every county chairman." Christie was also a top fundraiser for Bush's 2000 presidential campaign. He helped raise $350,000 for Bush, qualifying him as a "Pioneer", and also donated to DiFrancesco. Democrats seized upon the role played by Bush's political adviser, Karl Rove, after Christie's law partner, William Palatucci, a Republican political consultant and Bush supporter, boasted that he had selected a United States attorney by forwarding Christie's résumé to Rove. According to New Jersey's senior senator, Bob Torricelli, Christie promised to appoint a "professional" with federal courtroom experience as deputy if confirmed. By Senate tradition, if a state's senior Senator opposes the nomination of a U.S. Attorney, the nomination is effectively dead, but Christie's promise was enough for Torricelli to give the nomination his blessing. He was unanimously confirmed by the United States Senate on December 20, 2001, and sworn into office on January 17, 2002.

The brother of Christie's uncle (his aunt's second husband), Tino Fiumara, was an organized crime figure; according to Christie, the FBI presumably knew that when they conducted his background check. Later, Christie recused himself from the case and commented about what he had learned growing up with such a relative: "It just told me that you make bad decisions in life and you wind up paying a price."

Enforcement record 

Christie served as U.S. Attorney from January 17, 2002, to December 1, 2008. His office included 137 attorneys, with offices in Newark, Trenton, and Camden. Christie also served on the 17-member Advisory Committee of U.S. Attorneys for Attorneys General John Ashcroft and Alberto Gonzales.

Soon after taking office, Christie let it be known that his office would make public corruption a high priority, second only to terrorism. During his six-year tenure, he received praise for his record of convictions in public corruption cases. His office convicted or won guilty pleas from 130 public officials, both Republican and Democratic, at the state, county and local levels. The most notable of these convictions included those of Democratic Hudson County Executive Robert C. Janiszewski in 2002 on bribery charges, Republican Essex County Executive James W. Treffinger in 2003 on corruption charges, former Democratic New Jersey Senate President John A. Lynch Jr., in 2006 on charges of mail fraud and tax evasion, State Senator and former Newark Democratic mayor Sharpe James in 2008 on fraud charges, and Democratic State Senator Wayne R. Bryant in 2008 on charges of bribery, mail fraud, and wire fraud.

In 2005, following an investigation, Christie negotiated a plea agreement with Charles Kushner, under which he pleaded guilty to 18 counts of illegal campaign contributions, tax evasion, and witness tampering. Kushner was sentenced to two years in prison.

Christie negotiated seven deal deferred prosecution agreements (DPAs) during his tenure, some of which were controversial. Under agreements like these, corporations avoid prosecution if they promise not just to obey the law or pay for bad acts, but also promise to change personnel, or revamp business practices, or adopt new types of corporate governance. They are typically used in lieu of prosecution when there is evidence of particularly egregious corporate misconduct. Since 2002, these types of agreements have been sharply on the rise among federal prosecutors, with 23 between 2002 and 2005, and 66 between 2006 and 2008. Outside monitors are appointed in about half of all DPAs, to make sure that the corporations comply. In one case, Christie recommended the appointment of The Ashcroft Group, a consulting firm owned by his former boss John Ashcroft, as an outside monitor of Zimmer Holdings—a contract worth as much as $52 million from Zimmer, which was an amount in line with fee structures at that time. In another instance, Christie's office deferred criminal prosecution of pharmaceutical company Bristol Myers in a deal that required the company to dedicate $5 million for a business ethics chair at Seton Hall University School of Law, Christie's alma mater.

Christie defended the appointment of Ashcroft, citing his prominence and legal acumen. And he defended the Seton Hall donation as happenstance given that there was already a business ethics endowed chair at the only other law school in the state.
Still, cases like these led to new rules within the Justice Department, and sparked a congressional hearing on the subject.

Besides doubling the size of the anticorruption unit for New Jersey, Christie also prosecuted other federal crimes. For example, he obtained convictions of brothel owners who kept Mexican teenagers in slavery as prostitutes, convicted 42 gang members of the Double II Set of various crimes including more than 25 murders, and convicted British trader Hemant Lakhani of trying to sell missiles. Despite claims of entrapment, Lakhani was convicted by jury in April 2005 of attempting to provide material support to terrorists, unlawful brokering of foreign defense articles, and attempting to import merchandise into the U.S. by means of false statements, plus two counts of money laundering. He was sentenced to 47 years in prison.

In 2007, Christie prosecuted the planners of the averted 2007 Fort Dix attack plot, which he has frequently mentioned as a career highlight.

During the second term of George W. Bush, a controversy arose about the administration's dismissal of several U.S. attorneys, allegedly for political reasons. When it was revealed that Christie had been on a preliminary version of the hit list, New York Senator Charles Schumer said: "I was shocked when I saw Chris Christie's name on the list last night. It just shows a [Justice] department that has run amok." Pat Meehan, the U.S. attorney in Philadelphia, said: "Among his peers, Chris stands out as one of the most admired. If you were to create a list of the U.S. attorneys who have had the greatest impact, Chris would be one of the top two or three names I'd put on it. This defies explanation."

Christie's opponents claimed that he had gotten off the Bush administration's hit list by going after Congressman Robert Menendez; for example, The New York Times columnist Paul Krugman wrote, "Menendez's claims of persecution now seem quite plausible." Christie had issued a subpoena regarding Menendez 65 days before the 2006 Senate election, in which Menendez defeated Republican Thomas Kean Jr. to become New Jersey's junior senator. Christie's biographers (journalists Michael Symons and Bob Ingle) concluded that, "The timing of the Menendez-related subpoena doesn't line up right to support the critics' theory." Christie's aides have said that the subpoena was prompted by a newspaper report about Menendez, which prosecutors feared might imminently lead to destruction of documents and other evidence. The investigation of Menendez continued for years after Christie left office as U.S. Attorney, until Menendez was finally cleared on October 5, 2011.

Governor of New Jersey (2010–2018)

2009 gubernatorial campaign 

Christie filed as a candidate for the office of governor on January 8, 2009. Former Governor Thomas Kean helped Christie campaign and raise money. In the primary on June 2, Christie won the Republican nomination with 55% of the vote, defeating opponents Steve Lonegan and Rick Merkt. He then chose Kimberly Guadagno, Monmouth County sheriff, to complete his campaign ticket as a candidate for lieutenant governor. On November 3, Christie defeated Jon Corzine by a margin of 49% to 45%, with 6% of the vote going to independent candidate Chris Daggett.

2013 gubernatorial campaign 

In November 2012, Christie filed papers to run for a second term in office. Christie was reelected by a large margin on November 5, 2013, defeating Democratic nominee Barbara Buono. Christie advisors said that Christie sought to win by a large margin to position himself for the presidential primaries and develop a model for other Republican candidates. Christie began building a national fundraising network, aided by the fact that only one other state had a gubernatorial contest in 2013, and those financial resources were intended to support a major outreach effort toward blacks, Hispanics and women. He also ordered a $25 million special election to fill the seat of the deceased Senator Frank Lautenberg. The move was believed to be motivated by a desire to keep Newark Mayor Cory Booker from sharing an election day, 20 days afterward, with Christie, thereby depressing otherwise anticipated black voter turnout that tended to vote Democratic.

Tenure and political positions 

Christie took office as Governor of New Jersey on January 19, 2010. He chose not to move his family into Drumthwacket, the governor's official mansion, and instead resided in a private Mendham Township, New Jersey, residence.

Fiscal issues 
While campaigning for governor, Christie promised not to raise taxes. He also vowed to lower the state income and business taxes, with the qualification that this might not occur immediately.

As governor, Christie claims his annual budgets did not increase taxes, though he made reductions to tax credits such as the earned income tax credit and property tax relief programs, he would also sign legislation limiting property tax growth to 2% annually. Under Christie, there were no rate increases in the state's top three revenue generators: income tax, sales tax, and corporate tax.

In February 2010, Christie signed an executive order declaring a "state of fiscal emergency" due to the projected $2.2 billion budget deficit for that fiscal year. Following the order, Christie proposed a new budget which eliminated the New Jersey Department of the Public Advocate, which had an upkeep of $1.3 million. In late June 2011, Christie utilized New Jersey's line-item veto to eliminate nearly $1 billion from the proposed budget, signing it into law just hours prior to July 1, 2011, the beginning of the state's fiscal year. That same year, Christie signed into law a payroll tax cut authorizing the New Jersey Department of Labor and Workforce Development to reduce payroll deduction for most employees from $148 to $61 per year.

On five separate occasions, Christie vetoed legislation pushed by Democrats to implement a millionaire tax. After Democrat Phil Murphy became governor, Democrats backed off the legislation, with New Jersey Senate President Stephen Sweeney stating, "[t]his state is taxed out. If you know anything about New Jersey, they're just weary of the taxes."

During Christie's tenure, New Jersey's credit rating was downgraded nine times (across Standard & Poor, Fitch Ratings, and Moody's Investors Service), leaving only Illinois with a lower rating among U.S. states. Christie received a B grade in 2012 and in 2014 from the Cato Institute, a libertarian think tank, in their biennial fiscal policy report on America's governors.

Tax credits and incentives 
On September 18, 2013, Christie signed legislation to overhaul the state's business tax incentive programs. The legislation reduced the number of tax incentive programs from five to two, raised the caps on tax credits, and allowed smaller companies to qualify. It also increased the credits available for businesses in South Jersey.

Public employee pensions 
In March 2010, Christie signed into law three state pension reform bills, which had passed with bipartisan support. The laws decreased pension benefits for future hires and required public employees to contribute 1.5 percent of their salaries toward their health care. The laws prompted a lawsuit by the police and firefighters' unions. In his campaign for governor, Christie opposed any change in pension benefits for firefighters and law enforcement officers, including "current officers, future officers or retirees". He described the pension agreement as "a sacred trust".

Later that year, he called for further cuts, including the elimination of cost-of-living adjustments for all current and future retirees. In June 2011, Christie announced a deal with the Democratic leadership of the legislature on a reform of public employee pensions and benefits. The deal raised public employees' pension contributions, mandated the state to make annual payments into the system, increased public employee contributions toward health insurance premiums, and ended collective bargaining for health benefits. The reform is projected to save the state $120 billion over 30 years.

In June 2013, Christie signed a $33 billion state budget that makes a record $1.7 billion payment to the state's pension fund and also increases school funding by almost $100 million. The budget resulted from negotiations between Christie and Democratic leaders in the state legislature and was the first that Christie has signed as passed, without vetoing any of its provisions.

In May 2014, Christie cut the contributions to New Jersey public workers' pension funds for a 14-month period by nearly $2.5 billion to deal with a revenue shortfall in the state budget of $2.75 billion. The state will instead make a $1.3 billion payment during the period. Christie cited the state constitution's requirement to have a balanced budget for his decision to cut payments to pensions for state workers, and follows Christie's changes to the state's pension formula earlier in 2014 to save $900 million through the end of his term.

Legalization of online gambling 
In February 2013, online gambling was legalized in New Jersey after the state's Legislature passed Bill A2578, which was later signed into law by Christie. Christie was instrumental in the legalization of online gaming in the state, citing the need for increased state revenue in the years after the 2008 recession. After vetoing previous versions of the bill, Christie signed the latest version into law after ensuring the regulatory framework was in place to safeguard players and create a responsible gaming environment. Christie was also vocal about the offshore gambling market, claiming that states lost billions in tax revenues to offshore, unregulated, and untaxed operators.

In October 2014, Chris signed bill to legalize sports betting in New Jersey.

Education 
One of Christie's most controversial school policies was to increase the state's control of school districts. The districts contained relatively-high numbers of underachieving students, people of color, poor people, and members of the Democratic Party. In Newark, Christie hired Chris Cerf to replace Cami Anderson as the state-appointed superintendent of its school district. Under Christie, Cerf overruled the district's locally elected school board;, recent research indicated that the reforms advocated by Christie, Anderson, and Cerf did not improve educational outcomes.

Christie has been accused of under-funding school districts. Reports indicated that Christie's administration did not adhere to the School Funding Reform Act, and illegally withheld funds from districts throughout the state. His 2017 school-funding proposal was described by education researchers as "one of the least equitable in the country". State commissioner of education Chris Cerf defended policies declared unconstitutional by the Supreme Court of New Jersey, which contradicting basic education research.

Christie, whose children attend Catholic school, supports the state giving tax credits to parents who send their children to private and parochial schools. He also supports school vouchers, which parents of students in failing school districts could use for tuition in private schools or for public schools in communities outside their own. Christie supports merit pay for teachers.

On August 25, 2010, the U.S. Department of Health and Human Services announced that $400 million in federal Race to the Top education grants to New Jersey would not be issued due to a clerical error in the state's application by an unidentified mid-level state official. Christie said that the Obama administration had overstepped its authority, and the error was in the administration's failure to communicate with the New Jersey government. It was later learned that the issue had been raised with Bret Schundler, Christie's education commissioner. Christie asked for Schundler's resignation; Schundler initially agreed to resign, but asked to be fired the following morning to claim unemployment benefits. According to Schundler, he told Christie the truth and Christie misstated what actually occurred.

The Christie administration approved 23 new charter schools in January 2011, including New Jersey's first independent school for children with autism. The approvals increased the state's number of charter schools to 96.

On August 6, 2012, Christie signed a law reforming the tenure system for New Jersey public-school teachers. Under the law, teachers would be required to work four years (instead of three) to earn tenure; they would also need to receive positive ratings for two consecutive years. Tenured teachers with poor ratings for two consecutive years would be eligible for dismissal, with the hearing process for appeals related to dismissal of tenured teachers limited to 105 days.

On March 6, 2013, the Christie administration released proposed regulations to overhaul the process of evaluating public-school teachers. Under the proposal, a percentage of teacher evaluations would be based on student improvement in state tests or student-achievement goals set by principals.

In September 2014, Christie signed a partnership with Mexico on a higher-education project to foster economic cooperation. The program would focus on research ventures, cross-border fellowships, student and teacher exchanges, conferences, and other educational opportunities.

Energy and environment 
Christie has stated that he believes that the New Jersey Department of Environmental Protection is too big and is "killing business" with permit delays and indiscriminate fines. He announced that, if elected, the agency would be his first target for government reduction: he would reduce its workforce and strip it of its fish and wildlife oversight.

Christie has stated that he intends to simultaneously spur growth in the state's manufacturing sector and increase New Jersey's capability to produce alternative energy. He has proposed a list of policy measures to achieve this, including giving tax credits to businesses that build new wind energy and manufacturing facilities, changing land use rules to allow solar energy on permanently preserved farmland, installing solar farms on closed landfills, setting up a consolidated energy promotion program, and following a five-to-one production to non-production job ratio in the creation of new energy jobs. In August 2010, legislation to encourage the development of wind power in New Jersey was signed by Christie at the Port of Paulsboro. The Offshore Wind Economic Development Act authorized New Jersey Economic Development Authority to provide up to $100 million in tax credits for wind energy facilities. The governor has pledged to ban coal-fired power plants, and to reach 22.5% renewable generation in the state by 2021.

On May 26, 2011, Christie announced he would pull the state out of Regional Greenhouse Gas Initiative. This was challenged in court which ruled in March 2014 that Christie had acted illegally in doing so since state regulations do not permit it. His administration sought to repeal the rules.

Hydraulic fracturing 
Christie has rejected permanent bans on hydraulic fracturing (fracking) in New Jersey and vetoed measures that would ban the process and disposal of hydraulic fracturing waste in the State. New Jersey has few proven shale reserves and the process is not practiced there. Christie argued that the vetoed Senate Bill (S253) was premature because of an ongoing study to be completed in 2014 and would discriminate against other states, a violation of the Dormant Commerce Clause of the U.S. Constitution. Supporters of legislation have said that hydraulic fracturing waste from Pennsylvania makes its way into New Jersey for treatment, although how much is not clear. They also criticized Christie's legal analysis saying that the Office of Legislative Services has said that the bill is constitutional.

Exxon Mobil environmental contamination lawsuit 

Christie's settled a lawsuit with Exxon Mobil by allowing the corporation to pay $225 million in damages for environmental contamination at two sites, less than 3% of the $8.9 billion that the state's lawyers had sought, and extended the compensation to cover other damages not named in the original lawsuit. The settlement was slammed by environmental advocates. David Pringle, state campaign director of Clean Water Action, called it "the biggest corporate subsidy in state history," vowing to overturn it. Jeff Tittel of the Sierra Club called this move "a violation of the public trust." The New Jersey State Senate also condemned the deal, with state Senator Raymond Lesniak and others suggesting the decision was Christie's effort to plug his own budget shortfalls at the expense of taxpayers over the long term. ExxonMobil had donated $500,000 to the Republican Governors Association while Christie was chairman, though they have insisted it was unrelated to the ongoing suit. The previous gubernatorial administration, that of Democrat Jon Corzine, had also attempted to settle with Exxon, for $550 million, though this offer was made before a 2009 ruling that strengthened the state's bargaining position.

Farm animal welfare 
In June 2013, Christie vetoed S1921, an animal welfare bill introduced by the Humane Society of the United States to prohibit the use of gestation crates on pregnant pigs in the state. The bill had passed in the General Assembly with a vote of 60–5 and the Senate 29–4. A 2013 survey by Mason-Dixon Polling & Research Inc. showed 91% of New Jersey voters supported the legislation. An attempt to override the veto did not come to a vote. In October 2014, a similar bill banning gestation crates, S998, was proposed with a vote in the Senate of 32–1 and in the Assembly of 53–13 (with 9 abstentions). While campaigning in Iowa in November, in a conversation with the former president of the Iowa Pork Producers Association, Christie indicated he would veto the bill. He did so on November 27, 2014. The bill's sponsor, Senator Raymond Lesniak, had vowed to override it.

New Jersey Supreme Court nominations 

By tradition since the 1947 state constitution, the seven-member New Jersey Supreme Court maintains a political balance and is composed of four members of either the Democratic Party or Republican Party and three of the other. Christie broke with the tradition in May 2010 when he chose not to renominate Justice John E. Wallace Jr. While on the campaign trail, Christie had said the court "inappropriately encroached on both the executive and legislative function, and that if elected governor, [he] would take steps . . . to bring back an appropriate constitutional balance to the court."
Over the course of his tenure, Christie had been in a major conflict with the New Jersey Legislature over the court's partisan balance. The stand-off between the governor and the New Jersey Senate resulted in longstanding vacancies, with temporarily assigned appellate judges filling in.

Minimum wage and equal pay for women 
In January 2013, Christie vetoed a New Jersey Legislature bill that would have raised the minimum wage from $7.25 to $8.50 per hour. The following November, the issue was placed on the ballot as a constitutional amendment referendum, passing with 61% of the vote.

On September 21, 2012, Christie signed Assembly Bill No. 2647 (A-2647) into law that requires employers to post and distribute notice of employees' rights to gender-equal pay, but conditionally vetoed other gender parity bills, requesting revision.

Immigration 
Christie emphasizes the need to secure the border, and believes it is premature to discuss legalization of people who came to the United States unlawfully. While serving as U.S. Attorney for the District of New Jersey, Christie stressed that simply "[b]eing in this country without proper documentation is not a crime," but rather a civil wrong; and that undocumented people are not criminals unless they have re-entered the country after being deported. As such, Christie stated, responsibility for dealing with improperly documented foreign nationals lies with U.S. Immigration and Customs Enforcement, not the U.S. Attorney's Office.

Christie has been critical about section 287(g) of the Immigration and Nationality Act, enacted in 1996, which can be used to grant local law enforcement officers power to perform immigration law enforcement functions.

In state tuition for undocumented immigrants 
In December 2013, Christie signed legislation allowing unauthorized immigrants who attend high school for at least three years in New Jersey and graduate to be eligible for the resident rates at state college and universities and community colleges.

Social issues

LGBT rights 
As governor, Christie opposed same-sex marriage but voiced support for New Jersey's civil union law, which extended to gay couples the same legal benefits of marriage with regards to state law. Christie indicated in 2009 that he would veto any bill legalizing same-sex marriage in the state, saying, "I also believe marriage should be exclusively between one man and one woman.... If a bill legalizing same sex marriage came to my desk as Governor, I would veto it." On February 17, 2012, Christie vetoed a bill that would have legalized same-sex marriage in New Jersey. The bill passed by wide but not veto-proof margins in both houses of the legislature. Christie instead proposed that the issue be presented to the voters in a statewide ballot referendum.

The issue was rendered moot shortly thereafter by a state court decision, in which the judge stated New Jersey was "... violating the mandate of Lewis and the New Jersey Constitution's equal protection guarantee". The Christie administration responded by asking the state Supreme Court to grant a stay of the decision pending appeal, which was denied on October 18, 2013, in a 7–0 decision of the court which stated that it could "find no public interest in depriving a group of New Jersey residents of their constitutional right to equal protection while the appeals process unfolds". Three days later Christie withdrew the state's appeal.

Christie believes that homosexuality is innate, having said, "If someone is born that way, it's very difficult to say then that that's a sin." On August 19, 2013, Christie signed a bill outlawing gay conversion therapy for children, making New Jersey the second state to institute such a law. The law was challenged in the courts, with Christie, in his official capacity as governor, named an appellee.
In September 2014, a panel of the 3rd U.S. Circuit Court of Appeals upheld the law, saying it did not violate free speech or religious rights.

Abortion 
Early in his political career, Christie stated in an interview that "I would call myself … a kind of a non-thinking pro-choice person, kind of the default position". In 2009, Christie identified himself as anti-abortion, but stated that he would not use the governor's office to "force that down people's throats", while still expressing support for banning "partial-birth abortion", parental notification, and a 24-hour waiting period. He does support legal access to abortion in cases of rape, incest, or if the woman's life is in danger.

In 2014, campaigning in Alabama for incumbent governor Robert Bentley, Christie stated that he was the first "pro-life governor" elected in New Jersey since Roe v. Wade in 1973. He also stated that he had vetoed funding for Planned Parenthood five times as governor. In March 2015, Christie joined other potential 2016 Republican presidential candidates in endorsing a ban on abortions after 20 weeks of pregnancy.

Marijuana legalization 
Christie opposes legalizing the recreational use of marijuana, believing it to be a "gateway drug" and that tax revenue from the sale of it is "blood money". Christie said that if elected president he would "crack down" and enforce federal law in states that have legalized cannabis. In 2013, Christie signed a bill to more easily allow the use of medical cannabis by children in New Jersey. He opposed other efforts to expand the state's medical cannabis program during his governorship, however.

Vaccination 
Christie responded to calls by President Obama to prevent the spread of measles by saying that parents should have a choice. The governor's office said that he "believes vaccines are an important public health protection and with a disease like measles there is no question kids should be vaccinated", but that he was unaware of a free national program to provide new parents with a vaccine checklist.

Gun rights 
In December 2010, Christie commuted the seven-year sentence of Brian Aitken, who had been convicted of transporting three guns within the state; as a result, Aitken was released from prison.

Christie has said that each state has the right to determine firearms laws without federal interference. When announcing his candidacy in 2009 he said he supported aggressive enforcement of the state's current gun laws. In 2013, he chose not to defend a legal challenge to a New Jersey law requiring individuals to prove an urgent threat of violence before getting permits to carry handguns. In July 2014, Christie vetoed legislation that would have reduced the allowed legal size of ammunition magazines. Instead he re-wrote it, proposing a new standard for involuntary commitment of people who are not necessarily deemed dangerous "but whose mental illness, if untreated, could deteriorate to the point of harm" as well as other forms of involuntary mental health treatments. Christie had previously vetoed proposed legislation that would bar the state pension fund from investing in companies that manufacture or sell assault firearms for civilian use and a bill to prohibit the sale of .50-caliber rifles to civilians. In July 2015, Christie vetoed a bill passed by the Assembly, 74–0 (six abstentions), and the Senate by a 38–0 (two abstentions) which would require anyone seeking to have their mental health records expunged to purchase a firearm to notify the State Police, their county prosecutor and their local police department when petitioning the court. In October 2015, the New Jersey Senate voted to override Christie's veto.

In January 2018, during his final days as Governor of New Jersey, Christie signed legislation making bump stocks illegal in the state.

Transportation 
Christie has raised tolls and fares ("user fees") on the New Jersey Turnpike, Garden State Parkway, Hudson River crossings and NJ Transit buses and trains during his administration to fund projects throughout the state. In 2014, Christie authorized the increase of numerous other fees charged by the state for various licensing and administrative fees.

In 2010, Christie cancelled the Access to the Region's Core project,  which would have constructed two new tunnels under the Hudson River and a new terminal station in New York City for NJ Transit commuter trains. Christopher O. Ward advocated for the tunnel on behalf of the Port Authority. Christie cited escalating costs and possible further overruns as the reason for his decision. Proponents of the project said it would have created 6,000 construction jobs per year and 45,000 secondary jobs once complete. After the cancellation, New Jersey had to return $95 million to the federal government, and used $1.8 billion of Port Authority of New York and New Jersey money from the project budget to pay for repairs to the Pulaski Skyway, since the New Jersey Transportation Trust Fund that should fund such maintenance was effectively bankrupt. The termination of the project has made the need for increased rail capacity under the Hudson River more urgent, and Amtrak's Gateway Project to bore new tunnels is currently unfunded.

Response to Hurricane Sandy 

On December 28, 2012, the U.S. Senate approved $60.4 billion aid package for Hurricane Sandy disaster relief. The House did not vote until the next session on January 3. On January 2, Christie criticized the delay as "selfishness and duplicity" and blamed the House Speaker John Boehner and the rest of the House Republican leadership. A bill for relief was passed in the House on January 15.

In 2014, the U.S. Department of Justice opened an inquiry into allegations that Christie made state grants of Hurricane Sandy relief funds to New Jersey cities conditional on support for other projects.

Official visit to the Middle East 
Continuing the tradition of earlier New Jersey governors since the 1980s, Christie traveled to Israel in April 2012. During the visit, which included meetings with Prime Minister Benjamin Netanyahu and President Shimon Peres, Christie commented that "Jerusalem has never been better or freer than under Israeli control." Christie took a helicopter tour of the West Bank and cautioned against Israeli withdrawal from the West Bank, Jerusalem or the Golan Heights. The official title given to the trip was "Jersey to Jerusalem Trade Mission: Economic Growth, Diplomacy, Observance". The visit to Israel was Christie's first official overseas trip since taking office. From Israel, Christie continued with his family to Jordan, as guests of King Abdullah II.

Public opinion 
In the first months of his administration, Christie was viewed favorably with a 48% approval rating and a 13% disapproval rate. In the aftermath of Hurricane Sandy and his response to it, Christie's approval rating saw a high of 77%. In August 2014, his approval rating had dropped to 49% with disapproval estimated at 47%. In the aftermath of his campaign for the Republican nomination for president in 2016, a Rutgers-Eagleton survey found the governor's approval rating had dropped to 26%. A similar result was again found by the Institute in September 2016.

In May 2016, the Quinnipiac University Polling Institute found 64% of voters disapproved of the job Christie was doing, compared to 29% percent who approved. The following month, in June 2016, a Monmouth University Polling Institute survey found that just 27% of New Jersey adults approved of Christie's job performance, with 63% disapproving. Overall 79% of New Jersey adults polled said that Christie was more concerned with his political future than with governing the state.

In January 2017, another Quinnipiac poll found Christie's approval rating had slumped to 17% with a 78% disapproval rating, making it one of its lowest approval rating for a state governor (both in New Jersey and in the U.S.) in nearly 20 years. By April, another poll suggested that Christie was the least popular governor in the U.S., with a 71% disapproval rating.

In June 2017, Quinnipiac found that 15% approved of Christie, and 81% disapproved. This was the lowest recorded approval rating of a New Jersey governor in history, and the lowest approval rating found by Quinnipiac for any governor in any state in more than two decades. In a response, Christie said he didn't care about approval ratings because he was not running for office.

Allegations of corruption and abuse of power

Fort Lee lane closure 

From September 9 through September 13, 2013, two of the three traffic lanes in Fort Lee normally open to access the George Washington Bridge and New York City were closed on orders from a senior Christie aide and a Christie administration appointee. The lane closures in the morning rush hour resulted in massive traffic back-ups on the local streets for five days.

One common theory as to why the lanes were closed is that it was political retribution against Democratic Fort Lee Mayor Mark Sokolich for not supporting Christie in the 2013 gubernatorial election. Another possible motive involves a major real estate development project, which was a top priority for Sokolich, that was under way at the Fort Lee bridge access point.

Several of Christie's appointees and aides resigned, and Christie fired others, as investigations into the closures intensified. In a radio interview on February 3, 2014, Christie indicated that he "unequivocally" had no knowledge of, did not approve, and did not authorize plans to close the toll lanes, and stated that he first found out about the traffic jams from a story in The Wall Street Journal after the lanes had been reopened. In an interview on ABC, Christie reiterated that he was shocked by the actions of his former aides, stating that "Sometimes, people do inexplicably stupid things."

Other investigations were conducted by the United States Attorney for the District of New Jersey, the New Jersey Legislature, and the Port Authority of New York and New Jersey. On September 18, 2014, WNBC reported that unnamed federal sources said the US Attorney investigation had found no evidence that Christie had prior knowledge of or directed the closures. An interim report by the NJ legislative committee investigating the closures was released in December 2014. The committee had been unable to determine if Christie had advance knowledge since it was asked by the US Attorney to postpone interviewing certain key witnesses. At a press conference on May 1, 2015, U.S. Attorney Paul J. Fishman stated that, based upon the evidence that was available, his office would not bring any more charges in the case. However, in September 2016, federal prosecutors in a trial of two New Jersey government officials over their involvement in "Bridgegate" said that a defendant and a witness boasted about their actions to the governor at the time, confirming what Donald Trump had said in December 2015 while opposing Christie for the Republican nomination for the 2016 presidential election.

On October 13, 2016, a complaint of official misconduct that alleges that the governor knew of the closures of access lanes while they were ongoing but failed to act to reopen them was allowed to proceed. In response to the complaint filed by a local citizen, Bergen County Municipal Presiding Judge Roy McGeady said "I'm satisfied that there's probable cause to believe that an event of official misconduct was caused by Governor Christie. I'm going to issue the summons.". In response, Brian Murray, Christie's press secretary, accused Judge McGeady of "violating the law, pure and simple." The Superior Court overruled the probable cause decision and sent the case back to Judge McGeady, and although the Superior Court did not toss the complaint, requested by Gov. Christie's counsel, the court ruled that Judge McGeady's decision not to allow Gov. Christie's lawyers to participate in the original hearing (argue or cross-examine) was made "erroneously". In January 2017, Bergen County prosecutors said they would not seek criminal charges against Christie in connection with the scandal.

On November 4, 2016, a federal jury convicted former top Christie aides Bill Baroni and Bridget Anne Kelly of all charges. In March 2017, Baroni was sentenced to two years in prison and Kelly to 18 months in prison. The U.S. Supreme Court overturned the convictions on May 7, 2020.

Island Beach State Park incident 

In July 2017 during a budget shutdown and partial closing of state government services and facilities, the governor and his family were photographed from an airplane vacationing at Island Beach State Park alone on the beach. The beach which was closed to the public as a result of the shutdown, and Christie commuted to the beach from Trenton via state helicopter while his family was staying at the official governor's residence there. His spokesman said that he didn't "get any sun" because he was wearing a baseball cap at the time of the photo. When asked in an interview about people being upset that he was at the beach when they were unable to visit the beach, Christie responded, "'I'm sorry they're not the governor'".

Open records battles 
During his administration's eight years, the governor's office spent more than $1 million fighting New Jersey Open Public Records Act (OPRA) requests. On his way out, the governor, in an official letter to the State Archives, dictated how his office's records be handled. This came to light in May 2018, as the State Archives' release of electronic records relating to business by Jared Kushner, the president's son-in-law, were denied by his personal lawyer; Kushner's real estate company received $33 million in state tax breaks. Open records experts challenged Christie's "disturbing" actions.

Republican Governors Association 

In November 2013, Christie was elected chairman of the Republican Governors Association, succeeding Louisiana Governor Bobby Jindal. Christie campaigned extensively on behalf of Republican governors running for re-election. In the first three months of 2014, the RGA raised a record sum for the first quarter of a mid-term election year, and almost doubled the amount raised by the Democratic Governors Association during the same period.

Christie presided over net gains in Republican governorships in the 2014 elections, including for Republican gubernatorial candidates in three largely Democratic states: Bruce Rauner in Illinois, Larry Hogan in Maryland and Charlie Baker in Massachusetts.

Presidential politics

2012 presidential election
There was ongoing speculation that Christie would attempt a run for President of the United States in 2012 by competing in the Republican primaries. In September 2011, a number of press stories cited unnamed sources indicating Christie was reconsidering his decision to stay out of the race. An Associated Press story dated September 30 indicated a decision on whether he would run for president in 2012 would be made "soon". In a late September speech at the Reagan Library, he had again said he was not a candidate for president, but the speech also coincided with his "reconsideration" of the negative decision. The Koch brothers (David H. Koch and Charles G. Koch), Kenneth Langone, and retired General Electric CEO Jack Welch expressed support for a potential Christie candidacy. In October 2011, Christie said that he had reconsidered his decision but had again decided not to run for president, stating at a press conference: "New Jersey, whether you like it or not, you're stuck with me." Christie endorsed Mitt Romney for president a few days later.

Political commentators debated whether Christie's weight would or should affect his viability as a 2012 presidential candidate, either for medical or social reasons. The Obesity Society, a nonprofit scientific group, released a statement asserting, "To suggest that Governor Christie's body weight discounts and discredits his ability to be an effective political candidate is inappropriate, unjust, and wrong."

The New York Post has cited anonymous sources as saying Christie was not willing to give up the governorship to be Romney's running mate because he had doubts about their ability to win. The Romney campaign was reported to have asked him to resign his governorship if he became the vice-presidential nominee because "pay to play" laws restrict campaign contributions from financial corporation executives to governors running for federal office when the companies do business with the governor's state. A memo from the campaign attributed Romney's decision not to choose Christie as his running mate, in part, to unanswered questions during the vetting process regarding a defamation lawsuit following Christie's initial campaign for Morris County Freeholder, a Securities and Exchange Commission investigation of Christie's brother, as well as his weight.

Christie gave the keynote address at the Republican National Convention in August 2012. On October 30, 2012, during a press conference to discuss the impact of Hurricane Sandy, Christie praised the disaster relief efforts of President Barack Obama.

Christie stated he still supported Mitt Romney and was opposed to many of Obama's policies, but thought Obama deserved credit for his help in the disaster relief in New Jersey. Christie faced significant backlash before and after the election from conservative Republicans who accused him of acting to bolster his own personal political standing at the expense of Romney and the party.

In the aftermath of the election, Christie maintained his national profile and continued to clash with conservatives in his party by strongly criticizing House Speaker John Boehner regarding aid for Hurricane Sandy and then the National Rifle Association for their ad that mentioned President Obama's children. Christie was subsequently not invited to speak at the 2013 Conservative Political Action Conference (CPAC), which is largely seen as a stepping-stone for Republicans running for president. The CPAC chair explained that Christie was not invited "for decisions that he made", but that "hopefully next year he's back on the right track and being a conservative."

2016 presidential election

In January 2015, Christie took his first formal step towards a presidential candidacy by forming a political action committee (PAC) in order to raise funds and prepare for a likely 2016 presidential bid. On June 27, 2015, Christie launched his presidential campaign website. He formally announced his candidacy on June 30, 2015.

Christie dropped out of the race on February 10, 2016, after the New Hampshire primary following a poor showing and low poll numbers. He received 7.4% of the overall vote in the New Hampshire primary.

Despite having criticized Donald Trump prior to leaving the race, he endorsed Trump on February 26, 2016. On May 9, 2016, Trump named Christie to head a transition team in the event of a Trump presidency. He soon emerged as a major power with the Trump campaign.

Trump considered Christie as a potential vice-presidential running mate, and he was on the shortlist alongside former Speaker of the House Newt Gingrich and Indiana Governor Mike Pence. Trump passed over Christie and selected Pence. The subject's transition list for likely candidates for Trump's National Security Adviser did not include Michael Flynn, but rather, Peter Pace and William H. McRaven.

In September 2016, Christie acknowledged that the Fort Lee lane closure scandal, also known as Bridgegate, was a factor in his being denied the nomination. Trump had said earlier that Christie knew about the closures, which Christie denies. Following the release of Trump's tape-recorded comments on an Access Hollywood bus, Christie called Trump's comments "completely indefensible", but also added "I don't think it's the only way you should make a judgment."

After calls for his impeachment as governor and felony convictions in U.S. federal court of high-ranking members of his staff in the Bridgegate scandal, Christie was dropped by Trump as leader of the transition team, in favor of Pence. On the same day, Christie's close associates Richard Bagger and Bill Palatucci were both removed by Trump from the transition team. Former Congressman Mike Rogers, a national security expert on the Trump transition team, was additionally another close associate of Chris Christie who was also removed a few days after Christie's departure.

Christie was considered for a role in the Trump administration, but said he would serve out his term as governor, which ended in January 2018. On December 11, it was reported that Christie turned down offers to become Secretary of Homeland Security and Secretary of Veterans Affairs, because he wanted to be Attorney General. An 18-page report outlining questions and possible concerns about Christie joining the administration was released in June 2019.

2020 presidential election
In 2020, Christie offered to help Trump win re-election. One of his roles was helping the president to prepare for his first debate with challenger Joe Biden on September 29, 2020. He visited the White House repeatedly during the four days preceding the debate. He said the prep sessions involved five or six people in total, none of whom wore facial coverings despite the ongoing coronavirus pandemic. He added that he tested negative for the virus each time he entered the White House and saw no-one exhibiting symptoms. On October 3 he tested positive and was hospitalized, calling it a precautionary measure. He was released from the hospital on October 10.

Opioid epidemic efforts 
In March 2017, Trump picked Christie to chair the Opioid and Drug Abuse Commission, an advisory committee on the opioid epidemic in the United States.

Christie said that New Jersey would be spending $500 million on the epidemic, and in his last few months as governor promoted the Reach NJ Campaign, which included television ads in which he appeared.

In May 2019, Santa Monica, California, tech firm WeRecover announced that Christie had joined their team as Senior Advisor on Strategy and Public Policy. Upon joining Christie said, "As the chairman of the opioid task force, I was honored to shape our federal government's efforts to combat the opioid epidemic. But this isn't a problem government alone can solve. This is the worst epidemic we've ever faced, and we need the kind of innovation that can only come from the private sector. In WeRecover, I've found a team of some of the best and brightest people in tech, fully committed to broadening access to care through data, design and technology."

Post-gubernatorial career
In January 2018, Christie joined ABC News as a regular network contributor. In November 2018, it was reported that he was being considered for the role of United States Attorney General by the Trump Administration, although William Barr was ultimately selected. After meeting with Trump into December 2018, Christie said he did not want to be considered for the job of White House Chief of Staff.

Christie published a book titled Let Me Finish in January 2019. Also that year, he was selected for the Sports Betting Hall of Fame in recognition of his role in New Jersey's successful effort to overturn the Professional and Amateur Sports Protection Act, the U.S. federal law banning single-game sports betting outside Nevada.

In May 2020, Christie stated that measures taken during the COVID-19 pandemic in the United States should be lifted for economic reasons. "Of course, everybody wants to save every life they can – but the question is, towards what end, ultimately? ... Are there ways that we can ... thread the middle here to allow that there are going to be deaths, and there are going to be deaths no matter what?"

Christie registered as a lobbyist in June 2020. During the COVID-19 pandemic he was paid $240,000 for lobbying on behalf of a Tennessee-based chain of addiction treatment centers and three New Jersey hospital systems seeking federal funding.

Christie distanced himself from Donald Trump after the January 6, 2021 attack on the U.S. Capitol. In a September 9, 2021 speech at the Ronald Reagan Library in Simi Valley, California, Christie implored Republicans to reject their most extreme elements such as QAnon, white supremacists and election fraud conspiracy theorists.

In March 2021, Christie joined the board of directors of the New York Mets front office.

Personal life
In 1986, Christie married Mary Pat Foster, a fellow student at the University of Delaware. After marrying, they shared a studio apartment in Summit, New Jersey. Mary Pat Christie pursued a career in investment banking and eventually worked at the Wall Street firm Cantor Fitzgerald; she left the firm in 2001 following the September 11 attacks. Through April 2015 she was a managing director at the Wall Street investment firm Angelo, Gordon & Co.

Christie and Mary Pat have four children: Andrew (b. 1993), Sarah (b. 1996), Patrick (b. 2000) and Bridget (b. 2003). The family resides in Mendham Township.

Christie's hobbies have included coaching Little League, watching the New York Mets, and attending Bruce Springsteen concerts (141 of them). Christie's other favorite sports teams are the New York Knicks, New York Rangers, and Dallas Cowboys. He is a practicing Catholic and member of St. Joseph's Catholic Church.

Health
In 2011, columnist Eugene Robinson applied the term "extremely obese" to Christie, citing medical guidelines established by the National Institutes of Health. Christie himself was reportedly concerned about his weight and its implications for his health, describing himself as relatively healthy overall. Christie underwent lap-band stomach surgery in February 2013 and disclosed the surgery to the New York Post in May of that year.

On October 3, 2020, Christie tested positive for COVID-19 and was admitted to the Morristown Medical Center in New Jersey the same day, citing asthma as an underlying health concern. On October 10, Christie was released from the hospital. In his 2021 book, Republican Rescue, Christie revealed that Donald Trump called him while he was being hospitalized, and asked "Are you gonna say you got it from me?"

Bibliography 
 Let Me Finish, 2019
 Republican Rescue, 2021

See also 
 Electoral history of Chris Christie

References

Further reading 
 Ingle, Bob and Symons, Michael. Chris Christie: The Inside Story of His Rise to Power. Macmillan, 2012. .
 Manzo, Louis Michael. Ruthless Ambition: The Rise and Fall of Chris Christie. Trine Day, 2014. .
 Matt Katz. American Governor: Chris Christie's Bridge to Redemption.

External links

 Official 2016 Presidential Campaign website (last updated February 11, 2016)
 
 

|-

|-

|-

|-

|-

|-

|-

 
1962 births
Living people
21st-century American politicians
ABC News personalities
American people of German descent
American people of Irish descent
American people of Scottish descent
American people of Italian descent
Articles containing video clips
Candidates in the 2016 United States presidential election
Catholics from New Jersey
County commissioners in New Jersey
Republican Party governors of New Jersey
Lawyers from Newark, New Jersey
Livingston High School (New Jersey) alumni
New Jersey lawyers
New York Mets executives
People from Livingston, New Jersey
People from Mendham Township, New Jersey
Politicians from Newark, New Jersey
Seton Hall University School of Law alumni
United States Attorneys for the District of New Jersey
University of Delaware alumni